Sushil Bhattacharya (1924 – 18 July 2015) was an Indian professional football player and coach, who is credited for becoming the first manager of the India women's national football team. He was also the first head coach in history of East Bengal Club.

Playing career
Born in Bagdogra, Bhattacharya used to play both cricket and hockey beside football. He began his playing career with Town Club in Berhampur, representing the team in IFA Shield. He then appeared with Vidyasagar College and Sporting Union, before signing with East Bengal in 1945. With East Bengal, he achieved the double in 1945 by winning both the Calcutta Football League and IFA Shield. His consistent performances on both flanks in a 3–2–5 formation helped the team achieving success and earned him a national team callup in 1946. He spent four seasons for the "red and gold brigade", played until 1949, refusing Gostha Pal and Abhilash Ghosh's offers of joining Mohun Bagan.

Bhattacharya moved to Eastern Railway in 1949, returning briefly to East Bengal on loan in 1951, for the Durand Cup. At the tournament, they defeated Rajasthan Club 2–1 in final and lifted their first ever Durand Cup. He also appeared with George Telegraph in Calcutta Football League.

Coaching career
After retiring as a player, Bhattacharya began his coaching career with Eastern Railway, as an assistant coach. He was deputy of Bagha Shome at the club, which was then consisting players like P. K. Banerjee, Pradyut Barman, Prashanta Sinha, Nikhil Nandy and others. He later became the first-ever permanent "head coach" coach of East Bengal. He won the IFA Shield and Calcutta League with East Bengal in 1961.

Bhattacharya also managed Tollygunge Agragami and helped the team gaining promotion to the CFL first division. He also helped Tollygunge reaching the IFA Shield final in 1971, in which they went down 2–0 to Mohammedan Sporting. He then took charge of different age group teams of Bengal alongside the Narendrapur Ramkrishna Mission College football team and Kolkata Veterans Club. During his tenure as coach, he managed players like Tulsidas Balaram, Subhash Bhowmick, Bhaskar Ganguli, Sukumar Samajpati and Krishanu Dey.

In 1975, he came the first-ever manager of the Bengal women's team, and the first-ever manager of the newly formed India women's national football team. He is credited for nurturing Indian women talents like Shanti Mullick, the first ever Padma Shri awardee. Bhattacharya managed Indian women's team when, from 1975 to 1991, the administration was in hands of the Women's Football Federation of India (WFFI) and the Asian Ladies' Football Confederation (ALFC).

He was in charge of India S at the 1980 AFC Women's Championship in Calicut, in which they achieved second finish. In the next edition, at the 1981 AFC Women's Championship, India secured third place, and again finished as runners-up at the 1983. He also guided Bengal in Junior, Sub-Junior, Senior Women's National Football Championship and National Games, achieving nationwide success. He retired from coaching in 2008.

Death
Bhattacharya died of cancer at his home in Tollygunge, Kolkata, on 18 July 2015, aged 90.

Honours

Player
East Bengal
Calcutta Football League: 1945
IFA Shield: 1945

Eastern Railway
Rovers Cup runner-up: 1950

Manager
East Bengal
Calcutta Football League: 1961
IFA Shield: 1961
Dr. H. K. Mookherjee Shield: 1961
Rovers Cup: 1962

Tollygunge Agragami
IFA Shield runner-up: 1971

India (women's)
AFC Women's Championship runner-up: 1980, 1983

Individual
The Telegraph Hall of Fame: 2012

See also

 List of East Bengal Club coaches
 Women's football in India

References

Bibliography

Bandyopadhyay, Santipriya (1979). Cluber Naam East Bengal . Kolkata: New Bengal Press.
Chattopadhyay, Hariprasad (2017). Mohun Bagan–East Bengal . Kolkata: Parul Prakashan.

1924 births
2015 deaths
Indian footballers
East Bengal Club players
Indian football managers
East Bengal Club managers
Footballers from West Bengal
People from Darjeeling district
India women's national football team managers
Association footballers not categorized by position